Salto Mortale is a 1931 French-German drama film directed by Ewald André Dupont and starring Gina Manès, Daniel Mendaille and Léon Roger-Maxime. It was the French-language version of the German production Salto Mortale.

Cast
 Gina Manès as Marina 
 Daniel Mendaille as Jim 
 Léon Roger-Maxime as Robby 
 Alfred Machard as L'agent de publicité 
 François Viguier as Grimby 
 Marie-Antoinette Buzet as Une artiste 
 Michéle
 André Saint-Germain

References

Bibliography 
 Hans-Michael Bock and Tim Bergfelder. The Concise Cinegraph: An Encyclopedia of German Cinema. Berghahn Books, 2009,
 Crisp, Colin. Genre, Myth and Convention in the French Cinema, 1929-1939. Indiana University Press, 2002.

External links 
 

Category:German multilingual films

1931 films
German drama films
1931 drama films
1930s French-language films
Films directed by E. A. Dupont
French multilingual films
French drama films
Circus films
French black-and-white films
German black-and-white films
1931 multilingual films
1930s French films
1930s German films